Ammonium nonanoate is a nonsystemic, broad-spectrum contact herbicide that has no soil activity.  It can be used for the suppression and control of weeds, including grasses, vines, underbrush, and annual/perennial plants, including moss, saplings, and tree suckers.  Ammonium nonanoate is marketed as an aqueous solutions, at room temperature at its maximum concentration in water (40%).  Solutions are colorless to pale yellow liquid with a slight fatty acid odor. It is stable in storage. Ammonium nonanoate exists as white crystals.

Ammonium nonanoate is made from ammonia and nonanoic acid, a carboxylic acid widely distributed in nature, mainly as derivatives (esters) in such foods as apples, grapes, cheese, milk, rice, beans, oranges, and potatoes and in many other nonfood sources.

References

Herbicides
Ammonium compounds